Frank J. Hoffman (a.k.a. "The Texas Wonder"), was a Major League Baseball pitcher. He pitched in 12 games for the 1888 Kansas City Cowboys of the American Association. He played in the minor leagues through 1892.

External links

Major League Baseball pitchers
Baseball players from Texas
Kansas City Cowboys players
19th-century baseball players
New Orleans Pelicans (baseball) players
Hot Springs Blues players
San Antonio Missionaries players
Denver Grizzlies (baseball) players
Denver Mountaineers players
Sacramento Senators players
Houston Mud Cats players
San Francisco Metropolitans players
Date of birth missing
Date of death missing